The Volvo B10B was a rear-engined step deck single-decker bus chassis manufactured by Volvo between 1992 and 2001. The first prototype were built in 1990, but the B10B wasn't launched until the 1992 Geneva Motor Show. It superseded the Leyland Lynx (by then a Volvo product) and Volvo B10R. For stage use it was gradually succeeded by the low-entry B10BLE, which was introduced only a year later, though not in all markets. For interurban use the B7R came as a gradual replacement in 1998, and ultimately for coach work, the B12B took over in 2001.

The B10B was not generally available with a natural gas or biogas engine, like the B10BLE, but two buses were bodied by Vest Karosseri for NSB Biltrafikk in Stavanger in 1998 and 1999.

In the United Kingdom, the B10B was purchased in large numbers by GM Buses North, Merseybus, Oxford Bus Company, Trent and Yorkshire Rider. 

In Australia, the B10B was purchased in small numbers by Glenorie Bus Company, Grenda Corporation, North & Western Bus Lines, Parramatta-Ryde Bus Service and Westbus.

Portugal

Portugal has

 Camo Camus
 Camo Camus 3.4
 Camo Minerva
 Camo Jupiter
 Camo Jupiter II
 Irmãos Mota Atomic MK VII, MK VIII, UR95, and UR2000
 Marcopolo Tricana
 Alfredo Caetano Fenix
 GAF Voga

Competitors (chassis)
 Dennis Falcon
 Dennis Lance
 Leyland Lynx
 Leyland National
 MAN SL200
 MAN SL202
 Mercedes-Benz O405
 Renault PR100.2
 Scania L113CRB
 Scania N113CRB
 Volvo B10M

References

External links

B10B
Vehicles introduced in 1992
Bus chassis
Single-deck buses
Step-entrance buses